is a Japanese former ski jumper. At the height of his career, he became paralyzed in a car accident. He later participated in outrigger ski events.

References

External links

Living people
Japanese male ski jumpers
Sportspeople from Hokkaido
People from Yoichi, Hokkaido
Year of birth missing (living people)